Dhondo Keshav Karve (18 April 1858 – 9 November 1962), popularly known as Maharshi Karve, was a social reformer in India in the field of women's welfare. He advocated widow remarriage and he himself married a widow. Karve was a pioneer in promoting widows' education. He founded the first women's university in India - SNDT Women's University . The Government of India awarded him with the highest civilian award, the Bharat Ratna, in 1958, the year of his 100th birthday.He organized a conference against the practice of devdasi. He started 'Anath balikashram' an orphanage for girls. His intention was to give education to all women and make them stand on their own feet. Through his efforts, the first women university was set up in 20th century.

The appellation Maharshi, which the Indian public often assigned to Karve, means "a great sage".

 Early life 
Dhondo Keshav Karve was born on 18 April 1858, at Sheravali, in Ratnagiri district of Maharashtra. He belonged to a lower middle-class Chitpavan Brahmin family and his father's name was Keshav Bapunna Karve.

Career as a college professor
During 1891–1914, Karve taught mathematics at Fergusson College in Pune, Maharashtra.

Autobiographical works

Karve wrote two autobiographical works: Ātmawrutta (1928) in Marathi, and Looking Back (1936) in English.

Depictions in popular culture
The Marathi play Himalayachi Saavli (हिमालयाची सावली) (literal meaning, "The Shadow of the Himalayas". Contextually it means, under the cover of Himalaya) by Vasant Kanetkar, published in 1972, is loosely based on the life of Karve. The character of Nanasaheb Bhanu is a composite character based on Karve and other Marathi social reformers of the late 19th and early 20th century. The play itself depicts the tension between Bhanu/Karve's public life as a social reformer and his family life due to the social backlash and economic hardships his children and wife had to endure.The Story of Dr. Karve is a 1958 documentary film directed by Neil Gokhale and Ram Gabale. It was produced by the Government of India's Films Division.

The 2001 film Dhyaas Parva'' (ध्यास पर्व) by Amol Palekar, based on the life of Karve's son Raghunath, also depicts the Karve family, and their social reformation projects. Taluka Dapoli, a research based initiative, made a documentary on life of Maharshi Dhondo Keshav Karve in 2017.

Awards and honours
1942 – awarded Doctor of Letters (D.Litt.) by Banaras Hindu University
1951 – awarded D.Litt. by Pune University
1954 – awarded D.Litt. by S.N.D.T. University
1955 – awarded Padma Vibhushan by the Government of India
1957 – awarded LL.D. by University of Mumbai
1958 – awarded Bharat Ratna, the highest civilian award of India, by the Government of India

In his honour, Karvenagar in Pune was named after him & Queen's Road in Mumbai (Bombay) was renamed to Maharshi Karve Road.

See also

Maharshi Karve Stree Shikshan Samstha
The new Brahmans; five Maharashtrian families. Essays on D.K. Karve by his son and Irawati Karve

References

Recipients of the Bharat Ratna
Recipients of the Padma Vibhushan in literature & education
1858 births
1962 deaths
Hindu revivalists
Indian centenarians
Women's education in India
People from Ratnagiri district
Indian social reformers
19th-century Indian educators
20th-century Indian educators
Activists from Maharashtra
Educators from Maharashtra
People from Dapoli